The women's 100 metre backstroke was a swimming event held as part of the swimming at the 1924 Summer Olympics programme. It was the first appearance of the event, as women only swam freestyle events before this Games. The competition was held on Saturday July 19, 1924, and on Sunday July 20, 1924.

Records
These were the standing world and Olympic records (in minutes) prior to the 1924 Summer Olympics.

In the first heat Sybil Bauer set the first Olympic record with 1:24.0 minutes. In the final she bettered her own record to 1:23.2 minutes.

Results

Semifinals

Saturday July 19, 1924: The fastest two in each semi-final and the faster of the two third-placed swimmer advanced to the final.

Semifinal 1

Semifinal 2

Final

Sunday July 20, 1924:

References

External links
Olympic Report
 

Swimming at the 1924 Summer Olympics
1924 in women's swimming
Women's events at the 1924 Summer Olympics